Sevak "Sev" Ohanian (born June 2, 1987) is an American film producer and screenwriter. He is best known as the co-writer and producer of the films Searching and Run, as well as executive producer on the film Judas and the Black Messiah and founder of Proximity Media.

Early life 
Ohanian was born to an Armenian family in Germany, and moved to the U.S. when he was 4 months old. At 20 years old, he wrote, directed and produced a microbudget film based on his own life titled My Big Fat Armenian Family. The movie found international success in the Armenian community worldwide. Ohanian used the proceeds from the films to help pay for tuition when he attended the University of Southern California School of Cinematic Arts and received an MFA in film and television production.

Career

2013–2017: Early career 
Since graduating from USC in 2012, Ohanian has been a producer on over a dozen feature films. Ohanian co-produced the film Fruitvale Station, written and directed by fellow USC graduate Ryan Coogler. Fruitvale Station went on to win the top audience and grand jury awards in the U.S. dramatic competition at the 2013 Sundance Film Festival, and also went on to premiere at the 2013 Cannes Film Festival and won the Prize of the Future.

In 2014, Ohanian produced a two-minute Google Glass spot called Seeds, directed by Aneesh Chaganty. The short became an internet sensation after garnering more than 1 million YouTube views in 24 hours, and earned him a spot on The Wrap's 2014 Innovator's List of "Thought Leaders who are Changing Hollywood." Ohanian produced Andrew Bujalksi's film Results, which premiered at Sundance in 2015 and was acquired by Magnolia Pictures. He also produced Clea DuVall's The Intervention, premiered at Sundance 2016 and was acquired by Paramount.

Ohanian taught producing as an adjunct professor at USC's School of Cinematic Arts from 2014 to 2018.

2018–present: Searching and beyond 
Ohanian co-wrote the script and produced the film Searching with his often collaborators co-writer and director Aneesh Chaganty, and fellow producer Natalie Qasabian. Searching premiered at Sundance 2018 and was theatrically released in August by Sony Screen Gems making over $75M worldwide.  The film starred John Cho and Debra Messing, and won the Sundance NEXT Audience Award as well as the Alfred P. Sloan Feature Film Award. Ohanian was the recipient of the Sundance Institute/Amazon Studios Narrative Producers Award.

Ohanian co-wrote and produced the film Run, which sold to Lionsgate after a bidding war. Run, which stars Sarah Paulson and Kiera Allen, was released in 2020 on Hulu, dropping plans for a wide theatrical release because of the worldwide coronavirus outbreak.

In 2018, Ohanian partnered with Ryan Coogler and Zinzi Coogler to form a production company, Proximity Media. They have so far produced Space Jam: A New Legacy, starring LeBron James and the Looney Tunes, and the Academy Award-winning Judas and the Black Messiah, starring Daniel Kaluuya and Lakeith Stanfield. They are in development on a number of other projects, including a film adaptation of the critically acclaimed Bitter Root comics.

In August 2019, Ohanian was announced as a producer of Missing alongside Natalie Qasabian and Aneesh Chaganty. The movie will feature a new set of characters from the first movie and be directed by Will Merrick and Nick Johnson who will co-write the screenplay based on a treatment by Ohanian and Chaganty.

In January 2021, Ohanian was announced as an executive producer on the HBO Max show The Future, a one-hour sci-fi tech drama based on Dan Frey's book The Future is Yours.

In February 2021, it was announced Ohanian's company Proximity Media has signed a 5-year exclusive TV deal with Disney. Also in 2021, Ohanian was selected by the Hollywood Reporter for their annual 35 under 35 Rising Executives list. Notably his sister, Ramela Ohanian, was also selected for the list.

Awards and nominations

References

External links

1987 births
Living people
People from Hadamar
Film producers from California
American film producers
German film producers
American people of Armenian descent
German people of Armenian descent
German emigrants to the United States